John Keip House is a historic home located at Logansport, Cass County, Indiana. It was built in 1915, and is a -story, "L"-plan brick dwelling with American Craftsman style design elements.  It has a hipped roof with overhanging eaves and exposed rafter tails, entrance porch with large square brick columns, porte cochere, and leaded glass windows.  Also on the property is a contributing garage and concrete steps.

John Keip was the manager of a brewery. The home was listed on the National Register of Historic Places in 2004.

References

Houses on the National Register of Historic Places in Indiana
Houses completed in 1915
Houses in Cass County, Indiana
National Register of Historic Places in Cass County, Indiana
Logansport, Indiana